Evi Huss (born 1974) is a German slalom canoeist who competed at the international level 1990 to 2001.

She won three medals in the K1 team event at the ICF Canoe Slalom World Championships with two golds (1997, 1999) and a bronze (1999). She also won a silver and two bronze medals in the same event at the European Championships.

World Cup individual podiums

References

West German female canoeists
German female canoeists
Living people
1974 births
Medalists at the ICF Canoe Slalom World Championships